Hesperus is a genus of beetles in the tribe Staphylinini. The genus has a nearly worldwide distribution with around 200 named species.

References

Staphylininae